In public transport, Route 20 may refer to:

Route 20 (MTA Maryland), a bus route in Baltimore, Maryland and its suburbs
Citybus Route 20 in Hong Kong
London Buses route 20

20